James Henry O'Rourke (September 1, 1850 – January 8, 1919), nicknamed "Orator Jim", was an American professional baseball player in the National Association and Major League Baseball who played primarily as a left fielder. For the period 1876–1892, he ranks behind only Cap Anson in career major league games played (1,644), hits (2,146), at-bats (6,884), doubles (392) and total bases (2,936), and behind only Harry Stovey in runs scored (1,370) (Stovey was a younger player; Anson played five seasons and O'Rourke four prior to 1876.).

Biography
O'Rourke was born in East Bridgeport, Connecticut, and worked on his family's farm while playing youth league and semi-pro baseball.  He began his professional career as a member of the Middletown Mansfields in 1872, joining the one-year-old National Association team as a catcher.  The Mansfields were not a top-tier team, and folded in August, but O'Rourke had impressed other teams sufficiently enough to be offered a contract with the Boston Red Stockings, with whom he played until 1878.  On April 22, 1876, O'Rourke had the first base hit in National League history.

He graduated from Yale Law School in 1887 with an LL.B., practicing law in Bridgeport between early playing stints, and earning the nickname "Orator Jim" because of his verbosity on the field, his intellect, and his law degree—uncommon in a game regarded as a rough immigrant sport at the time.

After leaving the major leagues following the 1893 season he continued to play in the minor leagues until he was over 50 years old. Returning to the Park City fulltime, O’Rourke helped organize the Connecticut State League in 1895, serving as league official, team owner, manager, and player. As a direct result Bridgeport retained a professional baseball team for over a third of a century. Proximity to Yale allowed Jim to umpire Ivy League ball games and he also devoted his expertise to consulting baseball hierarchy at the national level. Jim is credited with signing Harry Herbert in 1895, Bridgeport’s first African American to play pro ball.

In 1904, he made a final appearance with the New York Giants under manager and friend John McGraw, becoming at age 54 the oldest player ever to appear in the National League, and the oldest player to hit safely in a major league game.  O'Rourke is one of only 29 players in baseball history to appear in Major League games in four decades.

In 1912, he returned to the field to catch a complete minor league game at the age of 60.

O'Rourke died of pneumonia at age 68 in Bridgeport, Connecticut. He was elected to the Baseball Hall of Fame in 1945 as one of the earliest inductees from the 19th century. His older brother John O'Rourke and his son Jimmy O'Rourke also played in the majors.

One legend concerning O'Rourke is that he was asked to drop the "O'" from his last name when he signed a contract with Boston and its Protestant backers.  The son of Irish immigrants and the husband of a woman born in Ireland, O'Rourke refused, saying "I would rather die than give up my father's name. A million dollars would not tempt me."

Another legend about O'Rourke is that his signing by the Mansfields in 1872 was conditioned on the team finding someone to take over O'Rourke's chores on his parents' farm.

Career statistics
In 1,999 games over 23 seasons, O'Rourke posted a .310 batting average (2,639-for-8,503) with 1,729 runs, 468 doubles, 149 triples, 62 home runs, 1,208 RBI, 229 stolen bases, 513 bases on balls, .352 on-base percentage and .422 slugging percentage.

See also

 List of Major League Baseball career hits leaders
 List of Major League Baseball career doubles leaders
 List of Major League Baseball career triples leaders
 List of Major League Baseball career runs scored leaders
 List of Major League Baseball career runs batted in leaders
 List of Major League Baseball career stolen bases leaders
 List of Major League Baseball players to hit for the cycle
 List of Major League Baseball annual home run leaders
 List of Major League Baseball annual runs scored leaders
 List of Major League Baseball annual triples leaders
 List of Major League Baseball player-managers
 List of oldest Major League Baseball players
 List of Major League Baseball players who played in four decades

References

External links

, or Retrosheet

1850 births
1919 deaths
19th-century baseball players
Baseball players from Connecticut
Boston Red Caps players
Boston Red Stockings players
Bridgeport Orators players
Bridgeport Soubrettes players
Bridgeport Victors players
Buffalo Bisons (NL) managers
Buffalo Bisons (NL) players
Connecticut lawyers
Major League Baseball left fielders
Major League Baseball player-managers
Middletown Mansfields players
Minor league baseball managers
National Baseball Hall of Fame inductees
National League home run champions
New Haven Murlins players
New York Giants (NL) players
New York Giants (PL) players
Providence Grays players
Sportspeople from Bridgeport, Connecticut
Springfield Ponies players
Washington Senators (1891–1899) managers
Washington Senators (1891–1899) players
Washington Senators (NL) managers
Yale Law School alumni
19th-century American lawyers